The 1988 Local Council of the Russian Orthodox Church was the fourth in the history of the Russian Orthodox Church. It was held June 6 to 9, 1988 at the Trinity-Sergius Lavra in the Refectory Church. It was held in connection with the 1000th anniversary of the Christianization of Rus'. The most important outcome of the Council was the adoption of a new charter of the Russian Orthodox Church and the canonization of nine zealots of Orthodoxy. At the council in 1988, in contrast to the councils in 1945 and 1971, the debate on ecclesiastical order at various levels had been very busy, sometimes acute; often, members of the council expressed diametrically opposed opinions.

Background
The participants of the Council had to have all the bishops of the Russian Church, according to the election - two representatives from the clergy and laity of each diocese.

References

1988 in Christianity
1988 in Russia
1988 in the Soviet Union
20th-century Eastern Orthodoxy
Eastern Orthodoxy in the Soviet Union
History of the Russian Orthodox Church
Russian Orthodox Church in Russia
1988 conferences